Watabung Rural LLG is a local-level government (LLG) of Eastern Highlands Province, Papua New Guinea.

Wards
01. Mangiro
02. Kenangi
03. Koningi
04. Komoingareka
05. Yamofe
06. Komongu

References

Local-level governments of Eastern Highlands Province